Héctor Thomas Martínez (October 10, 1938 – December 23, 2008) was a decathlete from Venezuela.  He won more than ten medals in various athletics events at the Bolivarian Games in 1961–1973, as well as three medals at the Pan American Games in 1963 and 1967. He competed in the decathlon at the 1960 and 1964 Olympics with the best result of 20th place in 1960. In 1998 he was inducted into the Venezuelan Sports Hall of Fame. He died of cancer aged 70.

References

1938 births
2008 deaths
People from Bolívar (state)
Venezuelan decathletes
Olympic athletes of Venezuela
Athletes (track and field) at the 1959 Pan American Games
Athletes (track and field) at the 1960 Summer Olympics
Athletes (track and field) at the 1963 Pan American Games
Athletes (track and field) at the 1964 Summer Olympics
Athletes (track and field) at the 1967 Pan American Games
Pan American Games silver medalists for Venezuela
Pan American Games bronze medalists for Venezuela
Pan American Games medalists in athletics (track and field)
Central American and Caribbean Games gold medalists for Venezuela
Central American and Caribbean Games silver medalists for Venezuela
Competitors at the 1962 Central American and Caribbean Games
Central American and Caribbean Games medalists in athletics
Medalists at the 1963 Pan American Games
Medalists at the 1967 Pan American Games
20th-century Venezuelan people
21st-century Venezuelan people